The Meridian 11°15' East was proposed as prime meridian by Arno Peters in the Peters World Map.
The Meridian is the antipode of 168°45' West of Greenwich which runs through the Bering Strait and was proposed as a new date line. On Peters' world map the easternmost part of Asia and Russia is not displayed left of Alaska, as is usually done on Greenwich-centered maps, but on the right side as the rest of Russia and Asia.

The meridian, 11° 15' East of Greenwich traverses the city center of Florence in Italy and therefore is also known as Florence Meridian.

It passes through:

See also
11th Meridian East
12th Meridian East

External links

 http://hexadecimal.florencetime.net/

Named meridians
Prime meridians
Geography of Florence
e011.25th meridian east